The Laviolette Bridge (French: pont Laviolette) is an arch bridge connecting the city of Trois-Rivières, Quebec, Canada to Bécancour on the south shore of the Saint Lawrence River via Autoroute 55.

Overview
Laviolette Bridge is the only bridge that spans the Saint Lawrence River between Montreal and Quebec City; therefore, it provides an important connection between the North and South shores of the river.

The bridge, an impressive structure with elegant aesthetics, has become a major landmark of Trois-Rivières and the Mauricie region.

Approximately 40,000 vehicles cross the bridge each day.

History
Popular demand for a bridge had existed since the late 19th century. The construction of Laviolette Bridge did not start until 1964. On September 8, 1965, an explosion led to the bursting of a caisson because of water pressure, causing the death of twelve workers.

The bridge was inaugurated on December 20, 1967 by Fernand Lafontaine, the ministre de la voirie (minister of highways) of the government of Daniel Johnson, Sr. It thus replaced the former ferry system in place. The name honours the founder of Trois-Rivières, the Sieur de Laviolette.

In 2005, the Ministry of Transport of Québec began a three-year major renovation project, which caused major traffic jams throughout the summer of 2005, when the middle of the bridge was repaired. In 2006, the northern end was redone, followed by the southern end in 2007.

Specifications
Construction: 1964–1967
Cost: $50 million (CAD)
Pillars: 34
Total length: 2,707 m
Main span: 335 m

See also
Lake Saint-Pierre
List of crossings of the Saint Lawrence River
List of bridges in Canada

References
Cournoyer, Jean. La Mémoire du Québec (2001 edition). Les Éditions internationales Alain Stanké (Montreal). .
Histoire du pont Laviolette on Quebecweb.com

External links
 

Bridges completed in 1967
Road bridges in Quebec
Through arch bridges in Canada
Buildings and structures in Trois-Rivières
Transport in Trois-Rivières
Bridges over the Saint Lawrence River
Transport in Centre-du-Québec
Buildings and structures in Centre-du-Québec